Miroslav Marcinko (born 16 January 1964) is a Slovak ice hockey player. He competed in the men's tournament at the 1994 Winter Olympics.

Career statistics

Regular season and playoffs

International

References

1964 births
Living people
Olympic ice hockey players of Slovakia
Ice hockey players at the 1994 Winter Olympics
Sportspeople from Poprad
HC Košice players
HK Dukla Trenčín players
Czechoslovak ice hockey defencemen
Slovak ice hockey defencemen
Expatriate ice hockey players in France
Expatriate ice hockey players in Austria
Slovak expatriate ice hockey players in Finland
Slovak expatriate ice hockey players in Germany
Slovak expatriate sportspeople in France
Slovak expatriate sportspeople in Austria